In United States Naval Academy terminology, the Old Goat is the longest-serving Naval Academy graduate on active duty. Since 2014, the designation has been accompanied by an award created by a previous Old Goat, Rear Admiral Alton L. Stocks. The award - a crystal decanter engraved with the initials and class years of previous holders - is passed to a new Old Goat upon the current holder's retirement. There have been nine Old Goats so awarded, each after more than 35 years' service to the U.S. Navy.

Award Recipients

The current Old Goat is Admiral James F. Caldwell Jr. (USNA '81), who has served as Director, Naval Reactors since 2015 and is also the most senior  U.S. Navy four-star admiral on active duty by virtue of rank (14 August 2015). He received the title and accompanying award from Admiral William K. Lescher, the outgoing vice chief of naval operations on 31 August 2022.

Class of 1978
The Naval Academy's Class of 1978 is notable for producing four full (four-star) admirals, a distinction shared by only four prior USNA classes since the Academy's founding in 1845. As of 11 April 2018, all four admirals of the Class of 1978 have been recognized as the Old Goat.

References

United States Naval Academy
United States Naval Academy alumni